Euseius mba is a species of mite in the family Phytoseiidae.

References

mba
Articles created by Qbugbot
Animals described in 1962